The Bangladesh women's cricket team played the Ireland women's cricket team in June and July 2018. The tour consisted of three Women's Twenty20 International (WT20I) matches. The second match took place before the men's Twenty20 International match between Ireland and India which was played later the same day at the same venue.

In the opening match, Jahanara Alam became the first woman for Bangladesh to take a five-wicket haul in international cricket. Bangladesh won the opening two matches, therefore winning the series with one game to play. Bangladesh won the series 2–1 with Jahanara Alam named as the player of the series.

Squads

Bangladesh also named Jannatul Ferdus, Lata Mondal, Murshida Khatun and Suraiya Azmin as players on standby for the series.

WT20I series

1st WT20I

2nd WT20I

3rd WT20I

References

External links
 Series home at ESPN Cricinfo

2018 in women's cricket
Ireland 2018
Bangladesh 2018
International cricket competitions in 2018
2018 in Bangladeshi cricket
2018 in Irish cricket
Bangladeshi cricket tours of Ireland
Cricket